Skarsvåg is a village in Nordkapp Municipality in Troms og Finnmark county, Norway. The village lies along the northern coast of the island of Magerøya, and it claims the distinction of being the world's northernmost fishing village. The local fishing fleet primarily fishes for cod in the waters north of Magerøya. Skarsvåg Church is located in the village.

The village is apparently the northernmost settlement in the world that is accessible via a major road network, the European route E69.

References

External links
Skarsvåg and Northcape
Pictures from Skarsvåg and Northcape

Villages in Finnmark
Populated places of Arctic Norway
Magerøya
Nordkapp